The 1948 Occidental Tigers football team represented Occidental College in the Southern California Conference (SCC) during the 1948 college football season.  In their fourth season under head coach Roy Dennis, the Tigers compiled a perfect 9–0 record (4–0 against SCC opponents), won the SCC championship, and outscored all opponents by a total of 206 to 46.

The team concluded its season with a victory over Colorado A&M in the 1949 Raisin Bowl. Los Angeles Rams quarterback Bob Waterfield served as an advisory backfield coach as the team prepared for its bowl game.

Occidental was led on offense by halfback Johnny Trump and quarterback Joe Johnson.

Schedule

References

Occidental
Occidental Tigers football seasons
College football undefeated seasons
Occidental Tigers football